Live a Little is the first solo album by American singer Big Kenny, prior to his joining John Rich in the duo Big & Rich. Recorded in 1999 for Hollywood Records, the album was not released until 2005, after Big & Rich had released their debut album.  Its release coincided with the release of Rich's previously-unreleased debut album Underneath the Same Moon, also recorded in 1999 and released in 2006.  Unlike Kenny's work within the country music genre with Big & Rich, Live a Little is a mixture between rock and pop.  This album was followed by The Quiet Times of a Rock and Roll Farm Boy in 2009 and Big Kenny's Love Everybody Traveling Musical Medicine Show Mix Tape, Vol. 1 in 2010.

The track "I Pray for You" (listed here as "Pray for You") was also recorded by Rich on Underneath the Same Moon, and was a minor chart single for him in 2000.  Kenny re-recorded the song in 2005 with Rich for their second album as a duo, Comin' to Your City.

Track listing

Personnel
Big Kenny - lead vocals, background vocals, acoustic guitar
Steve Brewster - drums, drum loops, percussion
Gary Burnette - electric guitar, acoustic guitar
John Catchings - cello
Tabitha Fair - background vocals
Sam Hankins - background vocals
Mark Hill - bass guitar ("Pray For You" and "Outta Site")
Steve King - accordion
Tony Miracle - synthesizers
Randy Nations - electric guitar ("Cheater's Lament"), background vocals
Matt Pierson - bass guitar
John Rich - background vocals
Jeffery Roach - piano, Hammond B-3 organ, Fender Rhodes, Wurlitzer, synthesizer
Kristin Wilkinson - viola

References

2005 debut albums
Big Kenny albums
Hollywood Records albums